The Presumption of Sanity is a legal presumption.  Its effect is that a person who faces criminal trial is presumed sane until the opposite is proved.  Similarly, a person is presumed to have testamentary capacity until there is evidence to undermine that presumption.

Forensic psychiatry
Insanity in law